The term coordination geometry is used in a number of related fields of chemistry and solid state chemistry/physics.

Molecules

The coordination geometry of an atom is the geometrical pattern formed by atoms around the central atom.

Inorganic coordination complexes
In the field of inorganic coordination complexes it is the geometrical pattern formed by the atoms in the ligands that are bonded to the central atom in a molecule or a coordination complex. The geometrical arrangement will vary according to the number and type of ligands bonded to the metal centre, and to the coordination preference of the central atom, typically a metal in a coordination complex. The number of atoms bonded, (i.e. the number of σ-bonds between central atom and ligands) is termed the coordination number.
The geometrical pattern can be described as a polyhedron where the vertices of the polyhedron are the centres of the coordinating atoms in the ligands.

The coordination preference of a metal often varies with its oxidation state. The number of coordination bonds (coordination number) can vary from two as high as 20 in Th(η5-C5H5)4.

One of the most common coordination geometries is octahedral, where six ligands are coordinated to the metal in a symmetrical distribution, leading to the formation of an octahedron if lines were drawn between the ligands. Other common coordination geometries are tetrahedral and square planar.

Crystal field theory may be used to explain the relative stabilities of transition metal compounds of different coordination geometry, as well as the presence or absence of paramagnetism, whereas VSEPR may be used for complexes of main group element to predict geometry.

Crystallography usage
In a crystal structure the coordination geometry of an atom is the geometrical pattern of coordinating atoms where the definition of coordinating atoms depends on the bonding model used. For example, in the rock salt ionic structure each sodium atom has six near neighbour chloride ions in an octahedral geometry and each chloride has similarly six near neighbour sodium ions in an octahedral geometry. In metals with the body centred cubic (bcc) structure each atom has eight nearest neighbours in a cubic geometry. In metals with the face centred cubic (fcc) structure each atom has twelve nearest neighbours in a cuboctahedral geometry.

Table of coordination geometries
A table of the coordination geometries encountered is shown below with examples of their occurrence in complexes found as discrete units in compounds and coordination spheres around atoms in crystals (where there is no discrete complex).

Naming of inorganic compounds
IUPAC have introduced the polyhedral symbol as part of their IUPAC nomenclature of inorganic chemistry 2005 recommendations to describe the geometry around an atom in a compound.
IUCr have proposed a symbol which is shown as a superscript in square brackets in the chemical formula. For example, CaF2 would be Ca[8cb]F2[4t], where [8cb] means cubic coordination  and [4t] means tetrahedral. The equivalent symbols in IUPAC are CU−8 and T−4 respectively. 
The IUPAC symbol is applicable to complexes and molecules whereas the IUCr proposal applies to crystalline solids.

See also

Molecular geometry
VSEPR
Ligand field theory
Cis effect
Addition to pi ligands

References

Molecular physics
Chemical bonding
Coordination chemistry
Inorganic chemistry